Mud Bay may refer to:

Places
Mud Bay, Alaska
Mud Bay, British Columbia
Mud Bay, Goodenough Island, New Guinea
Mud Bay, Kitsap County, Washington, United States
Mud Bay, Thurston County, Washington, United States

Companies
Mud Bay pet store in the Pacific Northwest

See also
Blue Mud Bay, Northern Territory, Australia